Dennis Miller (1937 – 2 October 2022) was an Australian stage, television and film actor, best known for roles in TV movies and series. Miller started in the industry in 1958 and has acted in numerous television shows, he remained especially known for the ABC rural series Bellbird and recurring role on Blue Heelers as Ex-Sergeant Pat Doyle (1994–2000).

Biography
Miller born in Hobart, Tasmania in 1937, is notable for roles in serials such asHomicide, Matlock Police, The Flying Doctors, G.P., Stingers, A Country Practice and Water Rats and Elly & Jools.  
 
He appeared in numerous films both theatrically released and made-for-TV, including The Everlasting Secret Family, television movies, and miniseries, including A Cry in the Dark, Hoodwink, Scales of Justice, Kangaroo Palace, Stir, Starstruck and Colour in the Creek.

Personal life
He was married to actress Elspeth Ballantyne from 1968 to 1977. They had two children.

He retired from the industry in 2000 and apparently died on 2 October 2022 aged around 84-85, although media records have not been located

Filmography

References

Living people
Australian male television actors
Male actors from Hobart
1937 births